Wautoma Municipal Airport,  is a city owned public use airport located 2 miles (3 km) southwest of the central business district of Wautoma, Wisconsin, a city in Waushara County, Wisconsin, United States. It is included in the Federal Aviation Administration (FAA) National Plan of Integrated Airport Systems for 2021–2025, in which it is categorized as a local general aviation facility. The airport is home to EAA chapter 1331.

Although most airports in the United States use the same three-letter location identifier for the FAA and International Air Transport Association (IATA), this airport is assigned Y50 by the FAA but has no designation from the IATA.

Facilities and aircraft 
Wautoma Municipal Airport covers an area of 353 acres (143 ha) at an elevation of 859 feet (262 m) above mean sea level. It has two runways: 13/31 is 3,300 by 60 feet (1,006 x 18 m) with an asphalt surface and 8/26 is 2,334 by 120 feet (711 x 37 m) with a turf surface.

For the 12-month period ending May 20, 2021, the airport had 12,400 aircraft operations, an average of 34 aircraft operations per day: 97% general aviation, 2% air taxi and 1% military.
In February 2023, there were 33 aircraft based at this airport: all 33 single-engine.

See also
List of airports in Wisconsin

References

External links 
 

Airports in Wisconsin
Buildings and structures in Waushara County, Wisconsin